Adam Rutter (born 24 December 1986 in Sydney, Australia) is an Australian racewalker. He competed in the 50 km walk at the 2008 Summer Olympics and the 20 km walk at the 2012 Summer Olympics but did not finish either race.

References

External links
 
 
 

1986 births
Living people
Australian male racewalkers
Olympic athletes of Australia
Athletes (track and field) at the 2008 Summer Olympics
Athletes (track and field) at the 2012 Summer Olympics
Athletes from Sydney
World Athletics Championships athletes for Australia